Vishal Vinod kumar Joshi (born 21 Sept 1984 in Ahmedabad, Gujarat, India) is a cricketer who plays for Saurashtra in Indian domestic cricket. He is a Left-arm off break bowler who made his first-class debut in 2004 against Uttar Pradesh.

Joshi picked up 4/59 and 5/43 in the semifinal of the 2012-13 Ranji Trophy against Punjab to help Saurashtra register a 229-run victory. However, he was not selected in the team to play the final against Mumbai.

References

External links 
Vishal Joshi - Cricinfo profile
Vishal Joshi - CricketArchive profile

1984 births
Living people
Indian cricketers
Saurashtra cricketers
Cricketers from Ahmedabad